Olufemi Elias is a Nigerian lawyer who served as Registrar of the United Nations International Residual Mechanism for Criminal Tribunals (IRMCT) until 30 June 2020.

Early life and education
Elias studied at Corona School, and then Igbobi College, Lagos, Nigeria before obtaining a law degree from the University of Oxford, a Master of Laws from the University of Cambridge and a doctorate from University College London. He was called to the Nigerian Bar in 1988.

His father, Justice Taslim Olawale Elias was the very first Attorney-General and Chief Justice of Nigeria and a judge and President of the International Court of Justice.

Career
Elias has held several functions including being a Judge for Staff Appeals, Special Tribunal for Lebanon (STL); Legal Adviser and Director, Organisation for the Prohibition of Chemical Weapons (OPCW), The Hague; Executive Secretary (Registrar), World Bank Administrative Tribunal, Washington D.C.; Senior Legal Officer, OPCW; Special Assistant to the Executive Secretary, United Nations Compensation Commission (UNCC), Geneva and Legal Adviser, Governing Council Secretariat, UNCC.

Elias is a Visiting Professor at the Department of Law, Queen Mary University of London and has taught at the King's College London and the University of Buckingham. He is also the author of several publications in the field of International Law and was awarded the Honorary Membership Award of the American Society of International Law (ASIL) in recognition of his contributions to international law.

At the 2020 election, Elias joined the race to serve as a Judge of the International Court of Justice. He was not elected.

In early 2022, Elias was appointed by the International Monetary Fund to an external panel to strengthen institutional safeguards in the wake of a data scandal involving IMF Managing Director Kristalina Georgieva during her time at the World Bank.

Functions at the Mechanism
The Registrar heads the Registry, which provides administrative, legal, policy and diplomatic support services to all organs of the Mechanism.

Statements and speeches

Other activities
 Institut de Droit International, Membre Associé
American Society of International Law, Former Member of the Executive Council
 International Arbitration Review, Member of the Advisory Board
 African Association of International Law, Former Secretary General
 African Journal of International and Comparative Law, Member of the Editorial Board 
 International Gender Champions (IGC), Member
 International Law Association, Member
 Nigerian Society of International Law, Life Member
Igbobi College Old Boy's Association Merit Award for Professional Achievement

References

Nigerian officials of the United Nations
Alumni of the University of Cambridge
Alumni of the University of Oxford
Living people
Academics of the University of Buckingham
Academics of King's College London
Academics of Queen Mary University of London
Lawyers from Lagos
Nigerian academics
20th-century Nigerian lawyers
Igbobi College alumni
Year of birth missing (living people)